Sol Invictus is a Roman god identified with Sol (the solar deity in Ancient Roman religion).

Sol Invictus may also refer to:
Sol Invictus (band), an English neofolk band
Sol Invictus (album), a 2015 album by Faith No More
, a 2001 album by Akhenaton
Sol Invictus (holiday), a religious holiday celebrated by The Satanic Temple

See also
Augustus Sol Invictus (born c. 1983), former Libertarian, alt-right Republican candidate for U.S. Senate in Florida
Elagabalus (deity), a Syrian sun god
Mithraism
Sol (disambiguation)